The 1987 Oklahoma Sooners football team represented the University of Oklahoma in the 1987 NCAA Division I-A football season.  Oklahoma
was a member of the Big Eight Conference played its home games in Gaylord Family Oklahoma Memorial Stadium, where it has played its home games since 1923.  The team posted an 11–1 overall record and a 7–0 conference record to the Conference title outright under head coach Barry Switzer who took the helm in 1973. This was Switzer's twelfth conference title, fourth consecutive conference title and eighth undefeated conference record in fifteen seasons.

The team was led by All-Americans  Rickey Dixon (who won the Jim Thorpe Award), Mark Hutson, Keith Jackson, Danté Jones, and Darrell Reed After going undefeated in its eleven regular season games, it earned a trip to the Orange Bowl for an appearance against the Miami Hurricanes.  During the season, it faced three ranked opponents (In order, #12 Oklahoma State, #1 Nebraska, and #2 Miami). Both of its last two games were #1 vs. #2 matches with the last being a national title game in which it endured its only loss to the resulting national champion Hurricanes. The game marked the third Miami victory over Oklahoma in three seasons to former Switzer assistant coach Jimmy Johnson.

Jamelle Holieway led the team in rushing for the second season with 807 yards and in passing for the third of four times with 548 yards, Jackson led the team in receiving for the third straight season with 403 yards, Placekicker R. D. Lashar led the team in scoring with 91 points, Reed posted 8 quarterback sacks, Jones led the team with 125 tackles and Dixon posted 9 interceptions.  Dixon established the current school record total of 9 single-season interceptions.  He set the school record for single-season interception return yards with 232 that season and the career record with 303, which was broken by Derrick Strait in 2003.

Schedule

Personnel

Game summaries

North Texas

North Carolina

    
    
    
    

Jamelle Holieway 25 Rush, 170 Yds

Tulsa

Iowa State

Texas

Kansas State

Colorado

Kansas

Oklahoma State

Missouri

Nebraska

"Game of the Century II" The Bow - Patrick Collins

Orange Bowl

Rankings

Awards and honors
All-American: Rickey Dixon, Mark Hutson, Keith Jackson, Danté Jones, and Darrell Reed
Jim Thorpe Award: Dixon

Postseason

NFL draft

The following players were drafted into the National Football League following the season.

References

External links
 1987 season at SoonerStats.com

Oklahoma
Oklahoma Sooners football seasons
Big Eight Conference football champion seasons
Oklahoma Sooners football